"Gangsta" is a song by American singer and songwriter Kehlani. It serves as the fourth and final single from the Suicide Squad soundtrack. The song was released on August 1, 2016 by Atlantic Records and was written by Kehlani, Myron Birdsong, Skylar Grey, Andrew Swanson and JMIKE, with the latter two also producing the song. Lyrically the song speaks to their desire for a gangster's love for them referring to the relationship between The Joker and Harley Quinn in the movie from the latter's point of view. The song is also featured on the deluxe edition of SweetSexySavage.

Music video
The music video premiered in August 2016 on Kehlani's YouTube account. In the video Kehlani is seen in places making multiple references to the movie. They starts lying in a room of broken glass next to the bat Harley uses in the movie, swimming in a pool of water similar to acid Harley dives into, performing aerial acrobatics on the ceiling,  dancing in a club for a love interest who looks similar to the Joker with green hair, tattoos and purple clothes and finally meeting that love interest outside. This is intercut with scenes from the movie showing the relationship of Harley and the Joker.

Charts

Weekly charts

Year-end charts

Certifications

References

External links
Lyrics of this song at Genius

Kehlani songs
2016 singles
2016 songs
Atlantic Records singles
Songs written for films
Songs written by Skylar Grey
Songs written by Jason Evigan
Songs written by Kehlani
DC Extended Universe music
Songs written by Djemba Djemba
Songs written by Jacob Luttrell